The Agricultural Labour Action Party is a political party in Costa Rica.

The party was founded after the end of the Agrarian Politics Union Party. The first general elections contested by the party were in 1990, in which it received only 0.4% of the vote, and failed to win a seat. In 1994 its vote share dropped to 0.3%, again failing to win a seat. In 1998 its electoral performance improved, as it received 1.2% of the national vote and winning its first seat. However, in 2002 its vote share dropped to 0.7% and it lost its parliamentary representation.

References

Agrarian parties in Costa Rica
Labour parties
Political parties in Costa Rica
Political parties with year of establishment missing